Moythomasia (named for James Alan Moy-Thomas) is an extinct genus of early ray-finned fish from the Devonian period of Europe and Australia.

It had relatively large eyes, presumably to find prey in murky water. Its body was covered in specialized ganoid scales; the upper side of each scale sported a small pin that perfectly fit into the hollow lower side of the next scale. This allowed the fish to be both armored and flexible.

Species
 M. devonica (Clarke, 1885) [Palaeoniscus devonicus Clarke, 1885; Rhadinichthys devonicus (Clarke, 1885)]
 M. durgaringa Gardiner & Bartram, 1977
 M. lineata Choo, 2015
 M. nitida Gross, 1953
 M. perforata (Gross, 1942) [Aldingeria perforata Gross, 1942]

References

Devonian fish of Australia
Devonian fish of Europe
Palaeonisciformes
Devonian bony fish
Prehistoric ray-finned fish genera